Denmark have participated 10 times at the UEFA Women's Championship: Their best achievement is reaching the 
UEFA Women's Championships final in (2017).

UEFA Women's Championship

References 

 
Euro
Countries at the UEFA Women's Championship